A list of the most notable films produced in Bulgaria during the 2010s ordered by year of release. For an alphabetical list of articles on Bulgarian films, see :Category:Bulgarian films.

List

2010

2011

2012

2014

2015

2016

2017

References

External links
 Complete list of all Bulgarian films
 The Internet movie database
 Feature Films Bulgaria at Cineuropa

2010s
Films
Bulgaria